Congleton, Kentucky may refer to:

 Congleton, Lee County, Kentucky, a settlement in the United States
 Congleton, McLean County, Kentucky, a settlement in the United States